WKMQ (1060 AM) is a radio station  broadcasting a News Talk Information format. Licensed to Tupelo, Mississippi, United States, the station serves the Tupelo area.  The station is owned by iHeartMedia, Inc., through licensee iHM Licenses, LLC, and features programming from ABC Radio, CNN Radio and Premiere Radio Networks.

History
The station went on the air in 1973 with the call letters WJLJ. It ran a top 40 and a country format during the early 80s.  In the mid-80s, the station changed to a Contemporary Christian music station as "Christian Radio 1060 WCFB".

After a change in ownership, the station changed to Urban/R&B Format as "PowerMix 1060" with the call letters WPMX on November 30, 1990 which was the beginning of the urban/R&B format in the Tupelo area, which then transferred to WESE-FM 92.5 and evolved into "92.5 JAMZ" and currently "92.5 The Beat".

On April 18, 1994, the station changed its call sign to WWZD and simulcast its sister station WWZD-FM "Wizard 106.7".

On November 1, 1995 the station became news/talk with call letters WNRX, and on May 1, 2000 to the current WKMQ,

WKMQ airs Glenn Beck and Rush Limbaugh.

FM Translator
In addition to the main station on the frequency of 1060 kHz, WKMQ is relayed on an FM translator which covers most of the Tupelo city limits.

References

External links

FCC History Cards for WKMQ

KMQ
IHeartMedia radio stations